Chali Khamaz (also Romanized as Chālī Khamāz; also known as Chākhlāmāz and Chālkhāmāz) is a village in, and the capital of, Baruq Rural District of the Central District of Baruq County, West Azerbaijan province, Iran. At the 2006 National Census, its population was 1,501 in 341 households, when it was in Baruq District of Miandoab County. The following census in 2011 counted 1,557 people in 437 households. The latest census in 2016 showed a population of 1,431 people in 452 households. After the census, Baruq District was separated from Miandoab County, elevated to the status of a county, and divided into two districts.

References 

Populated places in West Azerbaijan Province